The Organization of American States (OAS; ; ; ; OEA) is an international organization that was founded on 30 April 1948 for the purposes of solidarity and co-operation among its member states within the Americas. Headquartered in the United States capital, Washington, D.C., the OAS has 35 members, which are independent states in the Americas. Since the 1990s, the organization has focused on election monitoring. The Secretary General of the OAS is Uruguayan Luis Almagro.

History

Background 
The notion of an international union in the New World was first put forward during the liberation of the Americas by José de San Martín and Simón Bolívar who, at the 1826 Congress of Panama (still being part of Colombia), proposed creating a league of American republics, with a common military, a mutual defense pact, and a supranational parliamentary assembly. This meeting was attended by representatives of Gran Colombia (comprising the modern-day countries of Colombia, Ecuador, Panama and Venezuela), Argentina, Peru, Bolivia, The United Provinces of Central America, and Mexico but the grandly titled "Treaty of Union, League, and Perpetual Confederation" was ultimately ratified only by Gran Colombia. Bolívar's dream soon floundered with civil war in Gran Colombia, the disintegration of Central America, and the emergence of national rather than New World outlooks in the newly independent American republics. Bolívar's dream of inter-American unity was meant to unify Hispanic American nations against external powers.

The pursuit of regional solidarity and cooperation again came to the forefront in 1889–1890, at the First International Conference of American States. Gathered together in Washington, D.C., 18 nations resolved to found the International Union of American Republics, served by a permanent secretariat called the Commercial Bureau of the American Republics (renamed the International Commercial Bureau at the Second International Conference in 1901–1902). These two bodies, in existence as of 14 April 1890, represent the point of inception to which the OAS and its General Secretariat trace their origins.

At the fourth International Conference of American States (Buenos Aires, 1910), the name of the organization was changed to the Union of American Republics and the Bureau became the Pan American Union. The Pan American Union Building was constructed in 1910, on Constitution Avenue, Northwest, Washington, D.C.

Foundation 

In the mid-1930s, U.S. President Franklin Delano Roosevelt organized an inter-American conference in Buenos Aires. One of the items at the conference was a "League of Nations of the Americas", an idea proposed by Colombia, Guatemala, and the Dominican Republic. At the subsequent Inter-American Conference for the Maintenance of Peace, 21 nations pledged to remain neutral in the event of a conflict between any two members. The experience of World War II convinced hemispheric governments that unilateral action could not ensure the territorial integrity of the American nations in the event of external aggression. To meet the challenges of global conflict in the postwar world and to contain conflicts within the hemisphere, they adopted a system of collective security, the Inter-American Treaty of Reciprocal Assistance (Rio Treaty) signed in 1947 in Rio de Janeiro.

The ninth International Conference of American States was held in Bogotá between March and May 1948 and led by United States Secretary of State George Marshall, a meeting which led to a pledge by members to fight communism in the western hemisphere. This was the event that saw the birth of the OAS as it stands today, with the signature by 21 American countries of the Charter of the Organization of American States on 30 April 1948 (in effect since December 1951). The meeting also adopted the American Declaration of the Rights and Duties of Man, the world's first general human rights instrument.

The transition from the Pan American Union to OAS would have been smooth if it had not been for the assassination of Colombian leader Jorge Eliécer Gaitán. The Director General of the former, Alberto Lleras Camargo, became the Organization's first Secretary General. The current Secretary General is former Uruguayan minister of foreign affairs Luis Almagro.

Modern day 
The OAS conducted an audit of the 2019 Bolivian general election, which opposition supporters argued was fraudulent. The OAS report contended that the results were marred by "clear manipulation" and significant irregularities leading to the 2019 Bolivian political crisis. Bolivian president Evo Morales resigned soon after, having lost the confidence of the country's military in what he described as a coup. Some media outlets debated whether it should be referred to as a coup. On 21 December, the Technical Mission of Electoral Experts sent by the European Union published a 67-page report made similar observations and conclusions to that of the OAS. They noted that "there were minutes with an unusually high number of null votes, blank votes and a hundred percent participation of voters in a series of polling stations" and highlighted the general failure of the TSE to declare these irregularities. Studies commissioned by the American left-leaning think tank CEPR, argued that the OAS report's statistical analysis was inaccurate and unreliable. The author of the OAS's vote return analysis stated that the CEPR's explanation of the results was implausible. The organization has been criticized by Mexico and the CEPR for their perception of interference into the internal affairs of Bolivia. The OAS observed the subsequent 2020 Bolivian general election stating there was no evidence of fraud. The New York Times concluded that there was some fraud, but that it was unclear how much or if it was sufficient to change the result of the election, and suggested the initial analysis by the OAS was flawed.

In April 2022, Nicaragua reported the completion of its withdrawal process from the OAS initiated in November 2021. The OAS stated that, due to the terms of treaty, the withdrawal would not take effect until 2023.

Milestones 
Significant milestones in the history of the OAS since the signing of the Charter have included the following:
1959: Inter-American Commission on Human Rights created.
1959: Inter-American Development Bank created.
1960: First application of the Inter-American Treaty of Reciprocal Assistance against the regime of Rafael Trujillo in Dominican Republic
1961: Charter of Punta del Este signed, launching the Alliance for Progress.
1962: OAS suspends Cuba.
1969: American Convention on Human Rights signed (in force since 1978).
1970: OAS General Assembly established as the Organization's supreme decision-making body.
1979: Inter-American Court of Human Rights created.
1991: Adoption of Resolution 1080, which requires the Secretary General to convene the Permanent Council within ten days of a coup d'état in any member country.
1994: First Summit of the Americas (Miami), which resolved to establish a Free Trade Area of the Americas by 2005.
2001: Inter-American Democratic Charter adopted.
2009: OAS revokes 1962 suspension of Cuba.
2009: OAS suspends Honduras due to the coup which ousted president Manuel Zelaya.
2010: The OAS intervened in the Haiti 2010 presidential election, demanding that the third-place candidate be permitted to participate in a runoff election with the first-place candidate, using flawed statistics to suggest the second place showing of the left-wing candidate, Jude Célestin, was invalid.
2011: OAS lifts the suspension of Honduras with the return of Manuel Zelaya from exile.
2017: Venezuela announces it will begin the process to leave the OAS in response to what it alleged was OAS interference in Venezuela's political crisis.
2019: During the Venezuelan presidential crisis, the President of the National Assembly Juan Guaidó, recognized by the National Assembly as the acting president, expressed his desire for Venezuela to remain a member of the OAS. the OAS voted to recognize Gustavo Tarre Briceño as Venezuela's delegate in April, the National Assembly's representative to the OAS.
2020: OAS concluded that the 2019 Bolivian general election was fraudulent.

Goals and purpose 
In the words of Article 1 of the Charter, the goal of the member nations in creating the OAS was "to achieve an order of peace and justice, to promote their solidarity, to strengthen their collaboration, and to defend their sovereignty, their territorial integrity, and their independence." Article 2 then defines eight essential purposes:
To strengthen the peace and security of the continent.
To promote and consolidate representative democracy, with due respect for the principle of non-intervention.
To prevent possible causes of difficulties and to ensure the pacific settlement of disputes that may arise among the member states.
To provide for common action on the part of those states in the event of aggression.
To seek the solution of political, judicial, and economic problems that may arise among them.
To promote, by cooperative action, their economic, social, and cultural development.
To eradicate extreme poverty, which constitutes an obstacle to the full democratic development of the peoples of the hemisphere.
To achieve an effective limitation of conventional weapons that will make it possible to devote the largest amount of resources to the economic and social development of the member states.

Over the course of the 1990s, with the end of the Cold War, the return to democracy in Latin America, and the thrust toward globalization, the OAS made major efforts to reinvent itself to fit the new context. Its stated priorities now include the following:

Strengthening democracy: Between 1962 and 2002, the Organization sent multinational observation missions to oversee free and fair elections in the member states on more than 100 occasions. The OAS also works to strengthen national and local government and electoral agencies, to promote democratic practices and values, and to help countries detect and defuse official corruption.
Working for peace: Special OAS missions have supported peace processes in Nicaragua, Suriname, Haiti, and Guatemala. The Organization has played a leading part in the removal of landmines deployed in member states and it has led negotiations to resolve the continents' remaining border disputes (Guatemala/Belize; Peru/Ecuador). Work is also underway on the construction of a common inter-American counter-terrorism front.
Defending human rights: The agencies of the inter-American human rights system provide a venue for the denunciation and resolution of human rights violations in individual cases. They also monitor and report on the general human rights situation in the member states.
Fostering free trade: The OAS is one of the three agencies currently engaged in drafting a treaty aiming to establish an inter-continental free trade area from Alaska to Tierra del Fuego.
Fighting the drugs trade: The Inter-American Drug Abuse Control Commission was established in 1986 to coordinate efforts and crossborder cooperation in this area.
Promoting sustainable development: The goal of the OAS's Inter-American Council for Integral Development is to promote economic development and combating poverty. OAS technical cooperation programs address such areas as river basin management, the conservation of biodiversity, preservation of cultural diversity, planning for global climate change, sustainable tourism, and natural disaster mitigation.

Organizational structure 

The Organization of American States is composed of an Organization of American States General Secretariat, the Permanent Council, the Inter-American Council for Integral Development, and a number of committees.

The General Secretariat of the Organization of American States consists of six secretariats.
Secretariat for Political Affairs
Executive Secretariat for Integral Development
Secretariat for Multidimensional Security
Secretariat for Administration and Finance
Secretariat for Legal Affairs
Secretariat for External Relations

The various committees of the Organization of American States include:
 The Committee on Juridical and Political Affairs
 The Committee on Administrative and Budgetary Affairs
 The Committee on Hemispheric Security
 The Committee on Inter-American Summits Management and Civil Society Participation in OAS Activities

The various commissions of the Organization of American States include: 
 Inter-American Commission of Women (CIM)
 Inter-American Commission on Human Rights (CIDH)
 Inter-American Telecommunication Commission (CITEL)

Funding 
The OAS has two funds, one for the General Secretariat, and one for specific programs and initiatives. The General Assembly asks for contributions from each member country based on its capacity to pay. In 2018 the General Secretariat's budget was $85 million of which the US contributed $50 million. In 2017 the US contributed $17 million to the fund for specific programmes which was almost a third of the total contributions for that year.

General Assembly 

The General Assembly is the supreme decision-making body of OAS. It convenes once every year in a regular session. In special circumstances, and with the approval of two-thirds of the member states, the Permanent Council can convene special sessions.

The Organization's member states take turns hosting the General Assembly on a rotating basis. The states are represented at its sessions by their chosen delegates: generally, their ministers of foreign affairs, or their appointed deputies. Each state has one vote, and most matters—except for those for which the Charter or the General Assembly's own rules of procedure specifically require a two-thirds majority—are settled by a simple majority vote.

The General Assembly's powers include setting the OAS's general course and policies by means of resolutions and declarations; approving its budget and determining the contributions payable by the member states; approving the reports and previous year's actions of the OAS's specialized agencies; and electing members to serve on those agencies.

Membership and adhesions 

Upon its foundation in 1948, the OAS had 21 members, most of them in Latin America:

Argentina
Bolivia
Brazil
Chile
Colombia
Costa Rica
Cuba
Dominican Republic
Ecuador
El Salvador
Guatemala
Haiti
Honduras
Mexico
Nicaragua
Panama
Paraguay
Peru
United States
Uruguay
Venezuela

The later expansion of the OAS included Canada and the newly independent nations of the Caribbean. Members with later admission dates (sorted chronologically):

Barbados (member since 1967)
Trinidad and Tobago (1967)
Jamaica (1969)
Grenada (1975)
Suriname (1977)
Dominica (1979)
Saint Lucia (1979)
Antigua and Barbuda (1981)
Saint Vincent and the Grenadines (1981)
Bahamas (1982)
Saint Kitts and Nevis (1984)
Canada (1990)
Belize (1991)
Guyana (1991)

Canada and the OAS 
Although admission into OAS' predecessor, the Pan American Union, was initially restricted to republics, several overtures were still made for Canada to join the organization in 1928, 1933, 1936, and 1938. During the 1936 Pan American Union Conference, the organization extended its membership from only "American republics" to "American states" to accommodate Canada's admission as a constitutional monarchy. However, U.S. opposition to Canadian membership prevented their admittance, with the U.S. fearing the admittance of Canada would bring with it British influence that could impede its freedom of action within the OAS. The U.S. reversed its position on Canadian membership in 1947. However, by that time, Canadian foreign policy had adopted an Atlanticist position with a European focus; resulting in the Canadian government seeing little value in pursuing OAS membership. 

From the 1960s to the 1980s, the Canadian government expressed some interest to join the OAS, having successfully applied for permanent observer status in 1972 to evaluate potential membership. In the 1980s, the Canadian government incrementally increased its participation in OAS activities. Canada signed the Charter of the Organization of American States on 13 November 1989. Canada's membership in the OAS was formalized when the decision was ratified on 8 January 1990.

In 2004–2005, Canada was the second largest contributor to the OAS, with an annual assessed contribution representing 12.36 percent of the OAS Regular Budget (US$9.2 million) and an additional C$9 million in voluntary contributions to specific projects. Shortly after joining as a full member, Canada was instrumental in the creation of the Unit for the Promotion of Democracy, which provides support for the strengthening and consolidation of democratic processes and institutions in OAS member states.

Sanctions against the Dominican Republic during Trujillo regime

During the 6th Conference of Foreign Ministers of the Organization of American States (OAS) in Costa Rica, from 16 to 20 August 1960, a conviction against the State of the Dominican Republic was agreed to unanimously. The penalty was motivated because the foreign ministers checked the veracity of the claim that the Rafael Trujillo regime had sponsored an attack against Rómulo Betancourt, at that time, constitutional president of Venezuela. The meeting was attended by foreign ministers from 21 American nations, including Cuba, which at that time had not yet been expelled from the inter-American system.

All countries, including the United States and Haiti, broke off diplomatic relations with the Dominican Republic. Additionally an economic blockade that affected the exports of sugar was applied, which at that time was the pillar of the Dominican economy.

It was the first application of the Inter-American Treaty of Reciprocal Assistance, which had been adopted at the OAS on 29 July 1960.

Status of Cuba 

The current government of Cuba was excluded from participation in the Organization under a decision adopted by the Eighth Meeting of Consultation in Punta del Este, Uruguay, on 31 January 1962. The vote was passed by 14 in favor, with one against (Cuba) and six abstentions (Argentina, Bolivia, Brazil, Chile, Ecuador, and Mexico). The operative part of the resolution reads as follows:

This meant that the Cuban nation was still technically a member state, but that the current government was denied the right of representation and attendance at meetings and of participation in activities. The OAS's position was that although Cuba's participation was suspended, its obligations under the Charter, the American Declaration of the Rights and Duties of Man, etc. still hold: for instance, the Inter-American Commission on Human Rights continued to publish reports on Cuba's human rights situation and to hear individual cases involving Cuban nationals. However, this stance was occasionally questioned by other individual member states.

The resolution to exclude Cuba was controversial when it was adopted, and the reintegration of Cuba into the Inter-American system has remained a frequent source of contention among the countries of the hemisphere ever since. Cuba's position was stated in an official note sent to the Organization "merely as a courtesy" by Minister of Foreign Affairs Raúl Roa on 4 November 1964: "Cuba was arbitrarily excluded ... The Organization of American States has no juridical, factual, or moral jurisdiction, nor competence, over a state which it has illegally deprived of its rights." The reincorporation of Cuba as an active member regularly arose as a topic within the inter-American system for instance, it was intimated by the outgoing ambassador of Mexico in 1998but most observers did not see it as a serious possibility while the present government remained in power. Since 1960, the Cuban administration had repeatedly characterized the OAS as the "Ministry of Colonies" of the United States of America. Fidel Castro and his brother Raúl attacked the OAS as a "Yankee bordello" and "instrument of imperialist domination" and vowed that Cuba would never join, although OAS rescinded the nation's expulsion in 2009 and invited it to apply for readmission. Venezuelan President Hugo Chávez promised to veto any final declaration of the 2009 Summit of the Americas due to Cuba's exclusion.

On 17 April 2009, after a "trading of warm words" between the administrations of U.S. President Barack Obama and Cuban leader Raúl Castro, OAS Secretary General José Miguel Insulza said he would ask the 2009 General Assembly to annul the 1962 resolution excluding Cuba.

On 3 June 2009, foreign ministers assembled in San Pedro Sula, Honduras, for the OAS's 39th General Assembly, passed a vote to lift Cuba's suspension from the OAS. The United States had been pressuring the OAS for weeks to condition Cuba's readmission to the group on democratic principles and commitment to human rights. Ecuador's Foreign Minister Fander Falconí said there will be no such conditions. "This is a new proposal, it has no conditions—of any kind," Falconí said. "That suspension was made in the Cold War, in the language of the Cold War. What we have done here is fix a historic error." The suspension was lifted at the end of the General Assembly, but, to be readmitted to the Organization, Cuba will need to comply with all the treaties signed by the Member States, including the Inter-American Democratic Charter of 2001.  A statement issued by the Cuban government on 8 June 2009 stated that while Cuba welcomed the Assembly's gesture, in light of the Organization's historical record "Cuba will not return to the OAS."

Suspension of Honduras (2009–2011) 

Following the expulsion of its President Manuel Zelaya, Honduras' membership of the Organization was suspended unanimously at midnight on 5 July 2009. The de facto government had already announced it was leaving the OAS hours earlier; this was not, however, taken into account by the OAS, which did not recognize that government as legitimate. An extraordinary meeting had been conducted by the OAS in Washington, D.C., with Zelaya in attendance. The suspension of Honduras was approved unanimously with 33 votes (Honduras did not vote). This was the first suspension carried out by the OAS since that of Cuba in 1962.

After Zelaya's return to Honduras in 2011, the country was re-admitted to the Organization on 1 June 2011 with 32 votes in favor and 1 (Ecuador) against. Venezuela expressed some reservations.

Status of Venezuela 
On 28 April 2017, Venezuela notified the OAS of its denunciation of the Charter of the OAS, which as per Article 143 would lead to the withdrawal of Venezuela from the OAS effective two years from the date of notification.  During this period, the country did not plan on participating in the OAS.

During the 2019 Venezuelan presidential crisis, the President of the National Assembly of Venezuela Juan Guaidó, who was recognized by the National Assembly as the acting president, sent a letter to the OAS Secretary General annulling the previous denunciation of the OAS Charter, and expressing his desire for Venezuela to remain a member of the OAS. The National Assembly designated a special envoy as representative to the OAS, lawyer Gustavo Tarre Briceño, who the OAS voted to recognize as Venezuela's delegate in April. In October 2022, a bloc of leftist OAS member states led a motion to remove Tarre's representation in the organization. Out of 35 members, 19 nations voted in favor of the motion and 4 against. The motion fell short of the 24 votes required for a two-thirds majority.

Status of Nicaragua 
On 7 November 2021, Nicaragua held a general election which saw President Daniel Ortega re-elected to a fourth term in office. In a vote by the OAS Permanent Council, 25 member states voted in favour of a resolution condemning the election. Seven countries, including Mexico, Honduras and Bolivia, abstained. The motion stated that the election was "not free, fair or transparent and lack[s] democratic legitimacy" and also instructed the Permanent Council to undertake an assessment of the situation and "take appropriate action".

In response to this statement, Nicaraguan Foreign Minister Denis Moncada announced on 19 November that Nicaragua would leave the OAS. Moncada called the bloc "an instrument of interference and intervention" and accused it of "facilitating the hegemony of the United States with its interventionism over the countries of Latin America and the Caribbean." According to Article 143 of the Founding Charter of the OAS, the process to withdraw from the organization takes two years after its announcement.

In April 2022, Nicaragua announced that it had completed its withdrawal from the OAS. It said the OAS' offices in Managua had been closed.  The OAS stated that, due to the terms of treaty, the withdrawal would not take effect until 2023.

Permanent observers 
As of 31 January 2014, there are 69 permanent observer countries including the four countries with territory or territories in the Americas—Denmark, France, the Netherlands, and the United Kingdom; as well as the European Union and India.

In March 2022, the OAS voted to suspend Russia as a permanent observer due to the 2022 Russian invasion of Ukraine.

Official languages 

The Organization's official languages are Spanish, Portuguese, French, and English. The Charter, the basic instrument governing OAS, makes no reference to the use of official languages. These references are to be found in the Rules of Procedure governing the various OAS bodies. Article 51 of the Rules of Procedure of the General Assembly, the supreme body of the OAS, which meets once a year, states that English, French, Portuguese, and Spanish are the four official languages. Article 28 stipulates that a Style Committee shall be set up with representatives of the four official languages to review the General Assembly resolutions and declarations. Article 53 states that proposals shall be presented in the four official languages. The Rules of Procedure and Statutes of other bodies, such as the Inter-American Council for Integral Development (CIDI), the Permanent Executive Committee of the Inter-American Council for Integral Development (CEPCIDI), the Inter-American Commission of Women (CIM), the Inter-American Drug Abuse Control Commission (CICAD), the Inter-American Commission on Human Rights (IACHR) and the Inter-American Juridical Committee (CJI), technical bodies of the OAS, also mention the four official languages in which their meetings are to be conducted. Policy is therefore dictated through these instruments that require use of the four official languages at meetings.

Although a number of other languages have official status in one or more member states of OAS (Dutch in Suriname; Haitian Creole alongside French in Haiti; Quechua and Aymara in Peru, Ecuador and Bolivia; Guaraní in Paraguay), they are not official languages of the Organization.

Specialized agencies
The OAS has five specialized agencies:
Pan American Health Organization (PAHO)
 (IIN)
Inter-American Commission of Women (CIM)
Pan-American Institute of Geography and History (PAIGH)
 (IICA)

See also 

African Union
Community of Latin American and Caribbean States
European Union
Flag of the Organization of American States
Organization of Ibero-American States
Regional integration
Rio Group
Rio Pact
Statues of the Liberators
Union of South American Nations
Young Americas Business Trust

Notes

References

Further reading

External links

 
 The Organization of American States in Haiti: Election Monitoring or Political Intervention?, from the Center for Economic and Policy Research, October 2011.

 
International diplomatic organizations
International organizations based in the Americas
International political organizations
Organizations established in 1948
1948 establishments in the United States
Organizations based in Washington, D.C.
Anti-communist organizations
United Nations General Assembly observers
United States–Caribbean relations
United States–Central American relations
United States–North American relations
United States–South American relations